North Fork Township may refer to:

 North Fork Township, Baxter County, Arkansas, in Baxter County, Arkansas
 North Fork Township, Pope County, Arkansas
 North Fork Township, Gallatin County, Illinois
 North Fork Township, Delaware County, Iowa
 North Fork Township, Stearns County, Minnesota
 North Fork Township, Ashe County, North Carolina, in Ashe County, North Carolina
 North Fork Township, Watauga County, North Carolina, in Watauga County, North Carolina

Township name disambiguation pages